Jorge Alejandro Castro Salazar (born 11 September 1990) is a Costa Rican football forward.

Club career
He began his career at Deportivo Saprissa before signing a four-year contract with a start in December 2012.

International career
Castro was included in the Costa Rica teams for the 2007 FIFA U-17 World Championship and 2009 FIFA World Youth Championship.

He was included in the Costa Rica national football team for the 2011 Copa América, but did not play at all in the tournament.

Career statistics

References

External links
 

1990 births
Living people
Footballers from San José, Costa Rica
Association football forwards
Costa Rican footballers
2011 Copa América players
Deportivo Saprissa players
IK Start players
Eliteserien players
Sarpsborg 08 FF players
SK Brann players
C.S. Herediano footballers
Santos de Guápiles footballers
C.S. Cartaginés players
Municipal Grecia players
C.F. Universidad de Costa Rica footballers
A.D.R. Jicaral players
Norwegian First Division players
Costa Rican expatriate footballers
Expatriate footballers in Norway
Costa Rican expatriate sportspeople in Norway
Guadalupe F.C. players
2009 CONCACAF U-20 Championship players